A pony is a small horse.

Pony, PONY or ponies may also refer to:

Businesses and brands
 Pony International, a footwear and apparel brand
 Hyundai Pony, a model of car
 Kodak Pony, a camera
 Pony (Seattle), a gay bar in Seattle, Washington, US
 Pony Malta, a Colombian soft drink brand of Malta

Music
 The Ponys (band), an American rock band
 Pony (Orville Peck album) (2019)
 Pony (Rex Orange County album) (2019)
 Pony (Spratleys Japs album) (1998)
 "Pony" (Kasey Chambers song) (2004)
 "Pony" (Ginuwine song) (1996)
 "Pony", a 2019 song by DaBaby from Baby on Baby
 "Pony", a 1972 song by Annette Peacock from I’m the One
 "Pony", a 1996 song by Swirlies from They Spent Their Wild Youthful Days in the Glittering World of the Salons
 "Pony", a 2007 song by Wildbirds & Peacedrums from Heartcore

Measure of volume
 Pony bottle, a small cylinder of breathing gas strapped to a diver's main tank for emergency use
 Pony bottle (beer), a bottle size popular in the United States
 Pony glass, a glassware size
 Pony keg, a beer keg size
 Pony, one U.S. fluid ounce in bartending terminology

People
 Pony Diehl (c. 1848–c. 1888), American Old West outlaw
 Arthur Halloway (1885–1961), pioneering Australian rugby league football player and coach
 Pony Poindexter (1926–1988), American jazz saxophonist
 Rodrigo Ruiz (born 1972), Chilean football manager and former player
 Jimmy Ryan (baseball) (1863–1923), American Major League Baseball player
 Pony (make-up artist), Korean make-up artist and Internet personality Park Hye-min (born 1990)

Places
 Pony, Indiana, United States, an unincorporated community
 Pony, Montana, United States, an unincorporated community and census-designated place
 Pony Mountain, Massachusetts, United States - see Chapel Brook
 Pony Lake, Ross Island, Antarctica

Sports
 Ponsonby Ponies, a rugby league club based in Ponsonby, New Zealand
 St. Joseph Ponies, the 1941 name of the St. Joseph Saints, a minor league baseball team that was based in St. Joseph, Missouri 
 PONY Baseball and Softball (Protect Our Nation's Youth), a youth baseball and softball organization
 Pennsylvania–Ontario–New York League, commonly known as PONY League, an early name of the New York–Penn League in Minor League Baseball

Other uses
 To pony or ponying, to lead (a horse) from another horse
 Pony (dance), a dance popular in the 1960s
 Pony (film), a 2002 Canadian short film by Ed Gass-Donnelly
 Pony, a London slang term for £25
 "Ponies" (short story), a short story by Kij Johnson
 Ponytail or pony, a hair style

See also
 
 Pony car, a class of car similar to the Ford Mustang
 Pony Club, an equestrian club for young people
 Pony Express, a U.S. rapid-mail service before the advent of railroads
 PONIE, a project of Perl
 Pomy (disambiguation)

 
Lists of people by nickname